Senko hanabi ( 線香花火 senkō hanabi ) (sparkler - literally: incense-stick fireworks) is a traditional Japanese firework. Essays about them date back to at least 1927.

They are a thin shaft of twisted tissue paper about 20 centimeters long with one end containing a few grains of a black gunpowder. The black powder composition consists of three basic chemicals: potassium nitrate, sulfur, and charcoal.

The pointed end is lit and held straight down, so that the flame is at the bottom. After a few seconds a glowing, molten slag will form. This is reportedly potassium sulfide, which contains carbon from the charcoal. They are ignited away from the wind and held with a steady hand, so that the delicate molten head does not drop and that the two phases of ignition are completed. Senko hanabi are included in packets of fireworks and are ignited last amongst other fireworks.

Senko hanabi are said to somehow hypnotize the watcher into silence and to evoke mono no aware (translated as "an empathy toward things," or "a sensitivity to ephemera"), a Japanese term describing a flash of sadness felt when reminded of the beauty and briefness of life. "The poignantly ephemeral has long been appreciated in Japan and is still felt in the quiet celebration of senko hanabi."

References

External links 
 Senko hanabi - beautiful Japanese sparkler
 image of lit senko hanabi
 Research Paper
 Where to buy in Japan 
 

Types of fireworks